The proportions of various human Y-DNA haplogroups vary significantly from one ethnic or language group to another in  Africa.

Data in the table below are based on genetic research. Each group sampled is identified in the second column by linguistic designation: AA = Afroasiatic, KS = Khoisan, NS = Nilo-Saharan and NC = Niger–Congo. The third column gives the total sample size studied, and the other columns indicate the percentage observed of particular haplogroups.



See also
Africa
Ethnic groups in Africa
African people
Languages of Africa
Y-DNA haplogroups by population
Y-DNA haplogroups in populations of the Near East
Y-DNA haplogroups in populations of North Africa
Y-DNA haplogroups in populations of Europe
Y-DNA haplogroups in populations of the Caucasus
Y-DNA haplogroups in populations of South Asia
Y-DNA haplogroups in populations of East and Southeast Asia
Y-DNA haplogroups in populations of Oceania
Y-DNA haplogroups in populations of Central and North Asia
Y-DNA haplogroups in indigenous peoples of the Americas

Notes

References

External links
Y-DNA Ethnographic and Genographic Atlas and Open-Source Data Compilation

Africa Subsaharan